The Churchville Test Area is a United States Army facility of the Aberdeen Proving Ground, located northeast of Bel Air, Maryland (in Harford County, Maryland, U.S.).

The Churchville Test Area is a hilly set of cross-country road test tracks providing a variety of steep natural grades and tight turns designed to stress engines, drivetrains and suspension systems for Army vehicles, such as the M1 Abrams tanks, M2 Bradley fighting vehicle and the Humvee.

On March 21, 2007, the Army celebrated the designation of a  buffer-zone alongside the Churchville Test Area, in conjunction with the Harford County Government, the Harford Land Trust, and the Hopkins family.  Part of the US Army's Compatible Use Buffer program, under the Pentagon's environmental protection initiative, this land-use purchase was $1.4M (US).

See also
 US Army Ordnance Museum
 Aberdeen, Maryland

Notes and references

External links
 Aberdeen Test Center
 APG Official site
 APG History

Research installations of the United States Army
Buildings and structures in Harford County, Maryland